The Lower Germanic Limes is the former frontier between the Roman province of Germania Inferior and Germania Magna. The Lower Germanic Limes separated that part of the Rhineland left of the Rhine as well as the Netherlands, which was part of the Roman Empire, from the less tightly controlled regions east of the Rhine.

The route of the limes started near the estuary of the Oude Rijn on the North Sea. It then followed the course of the Rhine and ended at the Vinxtbach in present-day Niederbreisig, a quarter in the town of Bad Breisig, the border with the province of Germania Superior. The Upper Germanic-Rhaetian Limes then started on the opposite, right-hand, side of the Rhine with the Roman camp of Rheinbrohl.

The Lower Germanic Limes was not a fortified limes with ramparts, ditches, palisades or walls and watchtowers, but a river border (Lat.: ripa), similarly to the limites on the Danube and Euphrates.
The Rhine Line was guarded by a chain of castra for auxiliary troops. It was laid out partly by Augustus and his stepson and military commander Drusus, who began to strengthen the natural boundary of the Rhine from the year 15 AD The decision not to conquer the regions east of the Rhine in 16 AD made the Rhine into a fixed frontier of the Roman Empire. For its protection, many estates (villae rusticae) and settlements (vici) were established. The names and locations of several sites have been handed down, mainly through the Tabula Peutingeriana and Itinerarium Antonini.

Together with the Upper Germanic-Rhaetian Limes, the Lower Germanic Limes forms part of the Limes Germanicus. In 2021, the Lower Germanic Limes were inscribed on the UNESCO World Heritage List as part of the set of "Frontiers of the Roman Empire" World Heritage Sites.

Topography 

As it runs along the Rhine the Lower Germanic Limes passes four landscapes with different topography and natural character. The southernmost and smallest portion, between the Vinxtbach and the area around Bonn still belongs to the Rhenish Massif, through which the river passes in a relatively narrow valley between the heights of the Westerwald and the Eifel Mountains. From roughly the area of Bonn, the Rhine valley opens into the Cologne Bay, which is bounded by the Bergisches Land, which hugs the river on the right-hand side, and the Eifel and High Fens to the southeast and east. The Cologne Bay has fertile loess soils and is characterized by a very mild climate. It is therefore little wonder that most of the rural vici and villae rusticae (farm estates) in Lower Germania were established in this area in Roman times. In the vicinity of the military camp of Novaesium, the Cologne Bay expands further into the Lower Rhine Plain, a river terrace landscape. Only a little west of today's German-Dutch border, roughly in the area of the legion camp of Noviomagus, the Lower Rhine Plain transitions into the watery marshland formed by the Rhine and Meuse and which finally ends at the North Sea in the Rhine-Meuse-Scheldt delta.

References

Literature 
 Tilmann Bechert: Germania inferior. Eine Provinz an der Nordgrenze des Römischen Reichs. Zabern, Mainz, 2007, .
 Tilmann Bechert, Willem J. H. Willems: Die römische Reichsgrenze von der Mosel bis zur Nordseeküste. Stuttgart, 1995, .
 Tilmann Bechert: Römisches Germanien zwischen Rhein und Maas. Die Provinz Germania inferior. (Edition Antike Welt, 4). Hirmer, Munich, 1982, .
 Julianus Egidius Bogaers, Christoph B. Rüger (eds.): Der niedergermanische Limes. Materialien zu seiner Geschichte. Rheinland Verlag, Cologne, 1974, .
 Michael Gechter: Die Anfänge des Niedergermanischen Limes. In: Bonner Jahrbücher. 179, 1979, pp. 1–129.
 Michael Gechter: Early Roman military installations and Ubian settlements in the Lower Rhine. In: T. Blagg, M. Millett (eds.): The early Roman empire in the West. 2. Auflage. Oxford Books 2002, S. 97–102.
 Michael Gechter: Die Militärgeschichte am Niederrhein von Caesar bis Tiberius. Eine Skizze. In: T. Grünewald, S. Seibel (eds.): Kontinuität und Diskontinuität. Die Germania inferior am Beginn und am Ende der römischen Herrschaft, Beiträge des deutsch-niederländischen Kolloquiums in der Katholieke Universiteit Nijmegen, 27. bis 30.6.2001. De Gruyter, Berlin, 2003, pp. 147–159 (Reallexikon der germanischen Altertumskunde, Ergänzungsband 35).
 Heinz Günter Horn (ed.): Die Römer in Nordrhein-Westfalen. Theiss, Stuttgart 1987; Lizenzausgabe. Nikol, Hamburg, 2002, .
 Anne Johnson: Römische Kastelle des 1. und 2. Jahrhunderts n. Chr. in Britannien und in den germanischen Provinzen des Römerreiches. Zabern, Mainz, 1987,  (Kulturgeschichte der antiken Welt, Vol. 37).
 Margot Klee: Grenzen des Imperiums. Leben am römischen Limes. Konrad Theiss Verlag, Stuttgart, 2006. . pp. 33–40.
 Hans Schönberger: Die römischen Truppenlager der frühen und mittleren Kaiserzeit zwischen Nordsee und Inn. In: Bericht der Römisch-Germanischen Kommission. 66, 1985, pp. 321–495.

External links 
 Lower Germanic Limes on the website of Dutch historian, Jona Lendering (English)
 Vici.org Lower Germanic Limes, interactive map
 »www.niedergermanischer-limes.de«
 Germania inferior on the private website of author, Peter Lichtenberger (German)
 De Limes - Grens van het Romeinse Rijk (Dutch)
 Romeinen in Nederland (Dutch)

Roman fortifications in the Netherlands
Roman frontiers
History of North Rhine-Westphalia
Archaeological sites in Germany
Archaeological sites in the Netherlands
History of the Rhineland
Roman fortifications in Germania Inferior